The 1900 United States presidential election in Nebraska took place on November 6, 1900. All contemporary 45 states were part of the 1900 United States presidential election. Voters chose eight electors to the Electoral College, which selected the president and vice president.

Nebraska was won by the Republican nominees, incumbent President William McKinley of Ohio and his running mate Theodore Roosevelt of New York.

Democratic Party candidate William Jennings Bryan lost his home state to McKinley by a margin of 3.24%. Bryan had previously defeated McKinley in the state four years earlier and would later win it again against William Howard Taft in 1908.

Results

Results by county

See also
 United States presidential elections in Nebraska

Notes

References

Nebraska
1900
1900 Nebraska elections